Asif Muhammad Bajwa OLY (born 8 March  1969) is a former field hockey player who played for Pakistan from 1992 to 1996. He later became the team's manager and chief coach. As of 2022, he is the secretary general of Pakistan Hockey Federation.

Career 
Asif started his career against Spain in 1991. Bajwa was a member of Pakistan's World Cup-winning hockey team in 1994, and played 74 international matches and scored 25 goals in his career. Bajwa assisted Kamran Ashraf in scoring the only goal of 1994 Hockey World Cup Final with an accurate cross from the right. He was a part of the bronze-winning Pakistan team at the 1992 Summer Olympics in Barcelona.

In 1995, Asif Bajwa received a Pride of Performance Award from the Government of Pakistan. In 2008, he became the secretary general of the Pakistan Hockey Federation, a role he has served in intermittently since then. 

On May 7, 2017 Asif Bajwa officially joined Pakistan Tehreek-e-Insaf to contest in 2018 general election for the National Assembly from the constituency NA-114 Sialkot.

References

External links
 
 Pakistan Hockey Team

1969 births
Living people
Field hockey players from Sialkot
Pakistani male field hockey players
Pakistani field hockey coaches
Recipients of the Pride of Performance
Olympic medalists in field hockey
Medalists at the 1992 Summer Olympics
Olympic bronze medalists for Pakistan
Asian Games medalists in field hockey
Field hockey players at the 1992 Summer Olympics
Field hockey players at the 1994 Asian Games
Asian Games bronze medalists for Pakistan
Medalists at the 1994 Asian Games
Pakistani sportsperson-politicians